Samuel George Armstrong Vestey, 3rd Baron Vestey,  (19 March 1941 – 4 February 2021) was a British peer, landowner, and businessman. He served as Master of the Horse to Queen Elizabeth II from 1999 to 2018. Lord Vestey was part of the  family dynasty that founded and still runs the Vestey Holdings multinational corporation.

Early life and education
Vestey was born on 19 March 1941 as the son of Captain The Hon. William Howarth Vestey, a Scots Guards officer who was killed in action in 1944 during the Second World War, and Pamela Vestey (née Armstrong; 1918–2011). He was a great-grandson of the celebrated opera singer Dame Nellie Melba on his mother's side. He was educated at Eton College before attending Sandhurst and serving as a Lieutenant in the Scots Guards.

Business career

Vestey was the chairman of the Meat Training Council from 1991 to 1995, before becoming chairman of the Vestey Group (now Vestey Holdings) in 1995. He was also a liveryman of the Worshipful Company of Butchers. In 1980, A Sunday Times investigation revealed that he and his cousin Edmund were found to have paid just £10 in tax on the family business's £2.3m profit made by the Dewhurst chain.

The Wave Hill walk-off
Vestey, through his family company, owned the Wave Hill Station in Australia at the time of the Gurindji strike (also known as the Wave Hill walk-off) which ran for nine years from 1966, after 200 Aboriginal Australian workers staged a strike against poor working conditions and pay, and land dispossession.

His role in the strike was mentioned by Ted Egan's song "Gurindji Blues", written in 1969 with Lingiari, and later popularised in the 1991 song by Paul Kelly and Kev Carmody, "From Little Things Big Things Grow". He also gets a mention in Irish folk musician Damien Dempsey's song "Wave Hill Walk Off", on his 2016 album No Force on Earth.

Public service

In 1954, Vestey succeeded his grandfather in the peerage title at the age of thirteen. His family seat is Stowell Park Estate in Gloucestershire, where his father is buried.

He was Chancellor (1988–91) and then Lord Prior (1991–2002) of the Most Venerable Order of the Hospital of St John of Jerusalem, having been appointed Bailiff Grand Cross (GCStJ) in 1987. He became a Deputy Lieutenant of Gloucestershire in 1982.

From 1999 to 2018, Vestey served as Master of the Horse to the Sovereign of the United Kingdom, Queen Elizabeth II, who appointed him Knight Commander of the Royal Victorian Order (KCVO) in the 2009 Birthday Honours.

The Queen promoted Vestey to Knight Grand Cross of the Royal Victorian Order (GCVO) in December 2018, on the occasion of him relinquishing his appointment as Master of the Horse. He was appointed as a permanent Lord-in-waiting to The Queen in August 2019.

Personal life
Vestey married Kathryn Eccles (died 13 December 2017) on 11 September 1970, and they were divorced in 1981. They have two daughters and four grandchildren:
The Honourable Saffron Alexandra Vestey (27 August 1971). She married Matthew Charles Idiens and they were divorced in 2001. They have two children. She married Charles Foster in 2008.
Alfred John Simon Idiens (1 April 1996)
Megan Rose Idiens (27 July 1998)
Evelyn Grace Foster (6 March 2009)
William George Foster (7 November 2011)
The Honourable Flora Grace Vestey (22 September 1978). She married Laurence J. Kilby and they were divorced in 2010. She married James Hall in 2011.
 
He married Celia Elizabeth Knight (1949 – 28 November 2020) on 22 December 1981. Celia Vestey was a godmother of the Duke of Sussex. They have three children:
William Vestey, 4th Baron Vestey (27 August 1983). He married Violet Gweneth Henderson on 29 September 2012. They have two children:
Ella Victoria Vestey (13 July 2015)
Samuel Oscar Mark Vestey (7 November 2018) 
The Honourable Arthur George Vestey (1985). He married Hon. Martha Beaumont in June 2015. They have three children:
Frank William Vestey (25 July 2016)
Cosima Dora Vestey (30 November 2018)
Daisy Celia Vestey (12 January 2021)
The Honourable Mary Henrietta Vestey (1992).  She married Edward Cookson in May 2019.
Lyra Celia Cookson (18 November 2021)

His elder son, William, served as a Page of Honour to Queen Elizabeth II from 1995 to 1998.

The Vestey family's combined wealth (Lord Vestey with his cousin, Edmund Hoyle Vestey) amounts to approximately £1.2 billion, according to the Sunday Times Rich List 2013.

Honours

Knight Grand Cross of the Royal Victorian Order 
Baronet, 3rd Baronet Vestey of Bessémer House
Grand Bailiff of the Order of St John
Queen Elizabeth II Golden Jubilee Medal
Queen Elizabeth II Diamond Jubilee Medal
Service Medal of the Order of St John

Arms

References

Further reading

External links

 Debrett's People of Today
 Order of St John website

 
 

1941 births
2021 deaths
People from Cotswold District
British people of Australian descent
Barons in the Peerage of the United Kingdom
Deputy Lieutenants of Gloucestershire
People educated at Eton College
Bailiffs Grand Cross of the Order of St John
Knights Grand Cross of the Royal Victorian Order
Scots Guards officers
21st-century British landowners
21st-century British farmers
British billionaires
British philanthropists
Samuel
Vestey